Orbi Dubai is an interactive visitor attraction in Mirdif City Centre in Dubai, United Arab Emirates. It is the third Orbi attraction in the world and the first to open outside of Japan.

History 
Orbi Dubai officially opened on 7 May 2017 and was attended by representatives from SEGA, the BBC and Majid Al Futtaim Leisure and Entertainment, as well as Orbi’s Nature Ambassador, the explorer Nabil Al Busaidi. Orbi Dubai is created by Japanese technology firm SEGA in collaboration with BBC Worldwide and Dubai shopping mall operator Majid Al Futtaim.

References

External links 
 Orbi Dubai

Amusement parks in the United Arab Emirates
Amusement parks in Dubai
Indoor amusement parks
Tourist attractions in Dubai